Patrick Cleofoster Whyte (born 13 January 1945) is a former West Indian cricket umpire. He stood in four ODI games between 1983 and 1988.

See also
 List of One Day International cricket umpires

References

1945 births
Living people
West Indian One Day International cricket umpires